Palaquium gutta is a tree in the family Sapotaceae. The specific epithet  is from the Malay word getah meaning "sap or latex". It is known in Indonesia as karet oblong.

Description
The bark is reddish brown. Inflorescences bear up to 12 flowers.

Distribution and habitat
Palaquium gutta is native to Sumatra, Peninsular Malaysia, Singapore and Borneo. Its habitat is lowland mixed dipterocarp, kerangas and limestone forests.

Uses
The seeds of Palaquium gutta are used to make soap and candles, occasionally in cooking. The latex is used to make gutta-percha. The timber is logged and traded as nyatoh.

Conservation
Palaquium gutta has been assessed as Near Threatened on the IUCN Red List. The significant threat to the species is deforestation: in Borneo for conversion of land to palm oil cultivation.

References

gutta
Trees of Sumatra
Trees of Malaya
Trees of Borneo
Plants described in 1847
Taxa named by Henri Ernest Baillon
Taxa named by William Jackson Hooker